Breklenkamp is a hamlet in the Dutch province of Overijssel. It is a part of the municipality of Dinkelland, and lies about 16 km north of Oldenzaal.

It was first mentioned in the late-10th century as Brakkinghem, and means "settlement of Brakko (person)". In 1840, it was home to 257 people.

 is a havezate which was built in the 1630s. The current layout dates from 1844. In 1990, it became a youth hostel, but has become private property in 1990.

References

Populated places in Overijssel
Twente
Dinkelland